Roadford Lake, also known as Roadford Reservoir is a man-made reservoir fed by the River Wolf. It is located to the north-east of Broadwoodwidger in West Devon, eight miles (13 km) east of Launceston and is the largest area of fresh water in the southwest of England. Operated by South West Water, it directly supplies water for North Devon. It also supplies Plymouth and southwest Devon via releases into the River Tamar for abstraction at Gunnislake. It is a Local Nature Reserve.

The creation of the reservoir in 1989 permitted extensive archaeological research to be undertaken in the valley of the River Wolf led by Professor Mick Aston of Bristol University and documented by the Channel Four documentary series Time Signs.

In 2008 South West Water received planning permission to build a 100-bed holiday village beside the lake.

Facilities
 Brown Trout fishing
 Lakeside Cafe
 Activities: 
 Sailing   
 Rowing
 Kayaking
 Windsurfing
 Canadian Canoes
 High Ropes Course
 Outdoor Archery Range
 Indoor Climbing wall
 Raft building 
 Footpath walks through mature forests/woodland
 Cycleway through mature forests/woodland
 Adjacent campsite

The facilities are managed by South West Lakes Trust, a registered charity.

Incidents
On 9 June 2022, two people died when the motorboat they were travelling in capsized on the lake.

References

External links
https://www.swlakestrust.org.uk/roadford-lake
https://rlsc.webnode.co.uk/
https://www.bristolnomads.org.uk/trip_reports/roadford_2000.php

Reservoirs in Devon
Local Nature Reserves in Devon